Brent Dominic Rahim (born 8 August 1978) is a Trinidad and Tobago former professional footballer who played as a midfielder.

Career
Rahim was born in Diego Martin. He played at the University of Connecticut, and was drafted to Los Angeles Galaxy in the 2001 MLS SuperDraft. He rejected the transfer and signed for Joe Public in his home country. He later played abroad, including a short spell in English club West Ham United where he was loaned to Northampton Town where he netted once against Queens Park Rangers in early 2003.

Rahim got 49 caps and scored 3 goals for the Trinidad and Tobago national team between 2000 and 2005. In May 2005 he was left out of the national team by new coach Leo Beenhakker, but he was called up as a standby player to the 2006 FIFA World Cup.

References

External links
Bio at socawarriors.net

1978 births
Living people
Trinidad and Tobago footballers
Association football midfielders
Trinidad and Tobago international footballers
Joe Public F.C. players
PFC Levski Sofia players
West Ham United F.C. players
Northampton Town F.C. players
Falkirk F.C. players
IF Sylvia players
San Juan Jabloteh F.C. players
TT Pro League players
First Professional Football League (Bulgaria) players
2000 CONCACAF Gold Cup players
2002 CONCACAF Gold Cup players
2005 CONCACAF Gold Cup players
LA Galaxy draft picks
UConn Huskies men's soccer players
English Football League players
Scottish Football League players
Trinidad and Tobago expatriate footballers
Trinidad and Tobago expatriate sportspeople in Bulgaria
Expatriate footballers in Bulgaria
Trinidad and Tobago expatriate sportspeople in England
Expatriate footballers in England
Trinidad and Tobago expatriate sportspeople in Scotland
Expatriate footballers in Scotland
Trinidad and Tobago expatriate sportspeople in Sweden
Expatriate footballers in Sweden
Alumni of the University of London
Alumni of the University of Cambridge